Tibioplus is a genus of sheet weavers that was first described by Ralph Vary Chamberlin & Vaine Wilton Ivie in 1947.

Species
 it contains only two species.
Tibioplus diversus (L. Koch, 1879) – Scandinavia, Russia, Mongolia, USA (Alaska)
Tibioplus tachygynoidesTanasevitch, 1989 – Kyrgyzstan

See also
 List of Linyphiidae species (Q–Z)

References

Araneomorphae genera
Linyphiidae
Spiders of Asia
Spiders of North America